Deh Rashid or Deh-e Rashid or Dehrashid may refer to:
 Deh Rashid, Chaharmahal and Bakhtiari
 Deh-e Rashid, Kurdistan
 Deh Rashid, Zabol, Sistan and Baluchestan Province
 Deh Rashid, Zehak, Sistan and Baluchestan Province